Jens Jørgen Rankenberg-Hansen (4 January 1939 – 2 January 2022) was a Danish football player and manager.

Career
He played 417 games as a defender for Esbjerg fB with whom he won four Danish football championships. He represented the Denmark national team in 39 games from 1962 to 1971, and was a part of the Denmark squad at the 1964 European Championship. After retiring, Hansen served as manager of Esbjerg fB for a short while in 1972. Hansen died on 2 January 2022, at the age of 82.

Honours
Esbjerg fB
 Danish football championship: 1961, 1962, 1963 and 1965
 Danish Cup: 1964

References

External links
 
  Esbjerg fB profile

1939 births
2022 deaths
People from Struer Municipality
Danish men's footballers
Association football defenders
Denmark international footballers
1964 European Nations' Cup players
Esbjerg fB players
Danish football managers
Esbjerg fB managers
Sportspeople from the Central Denmark Region